Andrew Wiggin (1671–1756) was grandson of Governor Thomas Wiggin, the first governor of the Upper Plantation of New Hampshire, which became the Royal Province of New Hampshire and also grandson of the governor of the Massachusetts Bay Colony, Simon Bradstreet. Rt. Hon. Andrew Wiggin, through his grandmother Anne Dudley, was the great-grandson of Governor Thomas Dudley.

Wiggin was Speaker Of The House Of Representatives of the colony of New Hampshire from 1727 to 1737. After 1737 he became a judge of the Supreme Court of Judicature for the colony of New Hampshire.

Andrew Wiggins was married to Abigail Follett in Dover, New Hampsphire September 2, 1697.

External links

1671 births
1756 deaths
Speakers of the New Hampshire House of Representatives